Priyanka Thimmesh is an Indian actress who mainly works in Kannada films. She has also debuted in Malayalam and Tamil films. She made her debut in the 2015 Kannada film Ganapa.

Early life

Priyanka was born in Bhadravati, Karnataka to Thimmesh and Girija. She has an elder brother. Priyanka did her schooling at St. Charles High School, Bhadravathi and completed her Diploma in Computer Science at Government Woman's Polytechnic College Shivamogga.

Career
Priyanka started acting by taking on roles in serial Preethienda as Kashmiri girl Gulabi which was telecasted in Suvarna TV. She made her debut in films when she acted as Brunda, in Prabhu Srinivas's critically acclaimed Ganapa. She also did a guest appearance in Akira. It was followed by more lead roles in Pataki with Ganesh and Joncena with Uthpal Kumar which is directed by Simple Suni. Priyanka is playing a lead role in upcoming film Bheema Sena Nala Maharaja directed by Karthik Saragur and produced by Pushkara Mallikarjunaiah. Priyanka played a lead role in Nivin Pauly's Malayalam film Kayamkulam Kochunni directed by Rosshan Andrrews.

Filmography

Television

References

External links
 

Living people
Indian film actresses
21st-century Indian actresses
Actresses in Kannada cinema
Kannada actresses
Actresses in Malayalam cinema
Actresses in Tamil cinema
1990 births